Lou Taylor Pucci (born July 27, 1985) is an American actor who first appeared on film in Rebecca Miller's Personal Velocity: Three Portraits in 2002. Pucci had his breakthrough leading role in Thumbsucker (2005), for which he won a Special Jury Prize at the Sundance Film Festival and the Silver Bear for Best Actor at the Berlin Film Festival. Pucci then starred in The Chumscrubber (2005), Fast Food Nation (2006), The Go-Getter (2007), Explicit Ills (2008), and Carriers (2009). Pucci had starring roles in the 2013 Evil Dead remake, as well as The Story of Luke (2013) and Spring (2014).

Early life and education
Pucci was born in Seaside Heights, New Jersey. His mother, Linda Farver, is a former model and beauty queen (Miss Union County), and his father, Louis Pucci, worked as a guitarist for the bands The Watch and Leap of Faith. He has two brothers. At the age of two, he moved to Keansburg, New Jersey. He is a graduate of Christian Brothers Academy in Lincroft, New Jersey.

Career
He first acted at the age of ten in a hometown production of Oliver!. Two years later he acted as an understudy on Broadway playing Freidrich in The Sound of Music.  He can be seen in Arie Posin's The Chumscrubber, the HBO miniseries Empire Falls, and starring as the lead in Mike Mills' film Thumbsucker, for which he received the Special Jury Prize for Acting at the 2005 Sundance Film Festival and the Silver Bear Award for Best Actor at the 2005 Berlin Film Festival. He also played "St. Jimmy" in Green Day's  "Jesus of Suburbia" music video (with Thumbsucker co-star Kelli Garner).

In 2009, Pucci had three films that screened at the Sundance Film Festival: Brief Interviews with Hideous Men, directed by John Krasinski; The Informers, with Billy Bob Thornton, Winona Ryder, Kim Basinger and Mickey Rourke, based on Bret Easton Ellis' collection of short stories of the same name; and The Answer Man (formerly Arlen Faber and The Dream of the Romans) with Jeff Daniels and Lauren Graham. Pucci was also a juror for the short film competition.

Pucci had roles in multiple indie films for the latter part of the decade, and had a leading role playing an autistic man in The Story of Luke (2013), alongside Seth Green. He also had a starring role in the Evil Dead (2013) remake, based on Sam Raimi's 1981 original and played one of the leading roles in the thriller Spring. In November 2014, Pucci starred as Teddy Courtney in a Law & Order: Special Victims Unit-Chicago P.D. crossover.

He also portrayed Ben in the horror film Ava's Possessions. In 2016, he starred alongside Michael Shannon in the western thriller Poor Boy, which premiered at the Tribeca Film Festival in April 2016.

In 2018, Pucci guest-starred in the first 3 episodes of Lifetime's thriller series You as Benji. In 2019 he guest-starred as Nock Nock in the FX comedy series You're the Worst, then went on to play a recurring role in American Horror Story: 1984.

Filmography

Film

Television

Music videos

References

External links

1985 births
American male film actors
Christian Brothers Academy (New Jersey) alumni
Living people
People from Keansburg, New Jersey
People from Seaside Heights, New Jersey
Sundance Film Festival award winners
Silver Bear for Best Actor winners
21st-century American male actors